Events from the year 1531 in Ireland.

Incumbent 
Lord: Henry VIII

Events 
 May – William Skeffington accepted the formal submission of the Gaelic leader Hugh Duff O'Donnell in Drogheda.
 Manus O'Donnell of Tyrconnell applies to the Lordship of Ireland for protection against the O'Neills of Tyrone.
 At the behest of O'Donnell, the Earl of Kildare and the Lord Justice of Ireland lead an English force into Ulster. They pillage the country until Kinard, where they turn back, daring not to venture further.
 A battle took place near the castle at Scairbh-Begoige, where Manus O'Donnell and his forces were routed by the Maguires.

Births
 Thomas Butler, 10th Earl of Ormond

Deaths
 Illann Buide Mac an Legha, renowned physician
 Sile Oc, daughter of Cairbre, chieftain of the O Birn of Sil Murray
 Donnchad O Briain, Tanist of Thomond

References

Bibliography
 Arnold-Baker, Charles. The Companion to British History. Routledge, 2015

 
1530s in Ireland
Ireland
Years of the 16th century in Ireland